WKHM (970 kHz) is a commercial AM radio station licensed to Jackson, Michigan.  It is owned by Jamie McKibbin, through licensee McKibbin Media Group, Inc., and broadcasts a talk radio format.  Studios, offices and the transmitter are on Glenshire Drive in Jackson.  WKHM programming is also heard on an FM translator station, 101.5 W268CA.

Weekdays begin with a local news and information program, "AM Jackson with Greg O'Connor," followed by a call-in show, "Talk Back Jackson with Steve Boyle."   The rest of the schedule is made up of syndicated talk shows, Rush Limbaugh, Sean Hannity, Dave Ramsey, Free Talk Live, Coast to Coast AM with George Noory and This Morning, America's First News with Gordon Deal.  Weekends include shows on money, health, home repair, technology, travel and pets, some of which are paid brokered programming.  Syndicated weekend hosts include Ben Ferguson, Bill Handel, Bill Cunningham, Leo Laporte and Arthur Frommer.

History
On December 7, 1951, WKHM first signed on. It offered a full service format of middle of the road music, news, talk and sports.  It was originally owned by The Jackson Broadcasting & TV Company.  WKHM was a network affiliate of the Mutual Broadcasting System.  In 1985, the station was bought by Cascades Broadcasting for $567,000.

It kept the same format for four decades but by the 1990s, as music listening shifted to FM radio, more talk programming was added to WKHM's line up.  Jackson Radio Works acquired WKHM in 1997.  The new owner completed the transition to full-time talk, eliminating all music programming except for a polka music show still heard on Sunday mornings.

Effective December 12, 2019, Jackson Radio Works sold WKHM, two sister stations, and three translators to Jamie McKibbin's McKibbin Media Group, Inc. for $3.8 million.

Sources 
Michiguide.com - WKHM History

References

External links

Radio Locator Information for W268CA

KHM
Radio stations established in 1951
1951 establishments in Michigan
News and talk radio stations in the United States